"You'll Never Walk Alone" is a song from the 1945 musical Carousel.

You'll Never Walk Alone may also refer to:
 You'll Never Walk Alone (Doris Day album), studio album
 You'll Never Walk Alone (Elvis Presley album), compilation